Colebrookea is a genus of plants in the family Lamiaceae, first described in 1806. It contains only one known species, Colebrookea oppositifolia, native to India, Pakistan, Nepal, Bhutan, Assam, Bangladesh, Myanmar, Thailand and Yunnan.

References

Lamiaceae
Flora of Asia
Monotypic Lamiaceae genera